Jason  "Cone" McCaslin (born 3 September 1980) is a Canadian musician, singer, songwriter, and record producer, serving as the bassist and backing vocalist of the band Sum 41.

Early life
McCaslin began playing bass at the age of 14, as a member of a grunge garage band called Second Opinion.
He is of Irish/Swedish descent.

He acquired the nickname "Cone" from fellow band member Deryck Whibley in high school, because he frequently ate ice cream cones at lunch.

Professional career
He co-created the garage punk/garage rock side project The Operation M.D., with Todd Morse (of H2O), in which he goes by the name Dr. Dynamite. He plays bass guitar and other instruments on the songs including lead vocals on a few tracks on both albums.  The first album, We Have an Emergency was released in Canada and Japan exclusively in 2007. Operation M.D. then released their second album Birds + Bee Stings worldwide in late 2010 on their own label Mouth To Mouth Music. He has also acted in many Sum 41 short films. For example, in Basketball Butcher, he gets beaten up, killed and eaten by Steve Jocz due to beating him at basketball. He also played Dante the drug dealer in 1-800-Justice.
He helped produce an album with Shelter With Thieves, a Canadian band from Halifax, Nova Scotia. The EP, entitled Confessions of a Toxic Generation, was nominated for two Nova Scotia Music Awards, for Group Recording and Loud Recording. The band won the Loud Recording award for the EP.

In December 2009, McCaslin was also producing five songs for a new album by Canadian piano rock band The Greatest Invention (Formally – Credible Witness), which eventually got released under Walter Senko.

Then in 2010 he began producing three songs for the seven-piece bluegrass/folk/indie band The Strumbellas. In September 2011 he was asked to produce the rest of the album My Father and the Hunter. It was released on February 21, 2012 and received a Juno Award nomination for Best Root/Traditional Album.
 
In October 2013 McCaslin made a cameo playing bass in The Strumbellas music video for "End of an Era". In 2013 McCaslin began working with Toronto band Sun K.  and produced their 7" (two songs) which was released and also produced their EP and LP over the following year. In 2014 McCaslin began producing two songs for the band LeBarons which were released in 2015.

Sum 41
In 1999, the band signed an international record deal with Island Records. The band released their debut album, All Killer No Filler in 2001. The band achieved mainstream success with their first single from the album, "Fat Lip", which reached number-one on the Billboard Modern Rock Tracks chart and remains the band's most successful single to date. All Killer No Filler was certified platinum in the United States, Canada and in the UK. The band has since released six more studio albums: Does This Look Infected? (2002), Chuck (2004) Underclass Hero (2007), Screaming Bloody Murder (2011), 13 Voices (2016) and Order in Decline (2019). Sum 41's first four studio albums are certified Platinum in Canada.

The band often performed more than 300 times each year and held long global tours, most of which lasted more than a year. They have been nominated for seven Juno Awards and have won twice (Group of the Year in 2002 and Rock Album of the Year for Chuck in 2005). Their fifth studio album, Screaming Bloody Murder, was released on March 29, 2011 and was nominated for a Grammy at the 2012 Grammys for the song "Blood in My Eyes" in the Hard Rock/Metal category.

Producing/mixing discography
P = Producing, M = Mixing
 The Operation M.D. – We Have an Emergency (co-produced with Todd Morse) 2007 – Nominated for Casby 2 Awards (Best New Artist + Best Indie Release) (P)
 Shelter With Thieves – Someday Is Never Soon Enough (Co-Produced 6 songs with band) Released April 19, 2011 – ECMA Award for "Loud" Recording of the Year (P)
 The Operation M.D. – Birds + Bee Stings (co-produced with Todd Morse) 2010 (P)
 Operation M.D. + Itorero – "We Stand" Song from the charity album "Rwanda Rises Up" Released June 22, 2010 (P)
 The Strumbellas – My Father and the Hunter – Released February 21, 2012 – Juno Award Nomination for "Best Roots/Traditional Album" (P)
 Walter Senko – From A Liar – Released 2013 (P)
 Sun K – Sweet Marie 7" – Released 2014 (P)
 Operation MD – Shake Your Cage (Single) – Released January 13, 2015 (P,M)
 Sun K – Northern Lies – Released March 10, 2015 (P)
 Anna Toth – Feeling Lost, Feeling Seen – Released July 2, 2015 (P)
 LeBarons – Trains 7" – Released Sept. 11, 2015 (P,M)
 Operation MD – Like Everyone Else (Single) – Released September 25, 2015 (P,M)

Instruments
McCaslin uses Fender '59 Re-Issue Precision Basses live and a Fender American Vintage '62 Re-Issue Precision Bass to record with. His personal favorite is an Olympic white Fender Precision Bass, since he was a fan of Dee Dee Ramone.

Personal life
He got married on September 5, 2008. During the wedding, McCaslin's fellow band members Deryck Whibley of Sum 41 and Toby Morse of H2O and The Operation M.D. performed "One" by U2 and "Pieces" by Sum 41.

McCaslin has two sisters. On December 22, 2014, his first son Max Grey McCaslin was born.

On October 9, 2018, he and his wife Shannon had a daughter, Ayla Rose McCaslin.

Discography

With Sum 41
 Half Hour of Power (2000)
 All Killer No Filler (2001)
 Does This Look Infected? (2002)
 Does This Look Infected Too? (2003)
 Chuck (2004)
 Go Chuck Yourself (2005)
 Underclass Hero (2007)
 All the Good Shit: 14 Solid Gold Hits 2000–2008  (2009)
 Screaming Bloody Murder (2011)
 13 Voices (2016)
 Order in Decline (2019)
 Heaven and Hell (TBA)

With The Operation M.D.We Have an Emergency (2007)Birds + Bee Stings (2010)

With Iggy PopSkull Ring'' (2003) – bass on "Little Know It All"

See also
 Sum 41
 The Operation M.D.
 List of bass guitarists

References

External links

official personal web site
Sum 41 official website
The Operation M.D. official website
Fender Artist Cone's Fender Artist Profile

Living people
1980 births
Canadian rock bass guitarists
Sum 41 members
Canadian people of Irish descent
Canadian people of Swedish descent
Alternative rock bass guitarists
Canadian rock guitarists
Canadian male guitarists
Alternative rock guitarists
20th-century Canadian bass guitarists
21st-century Canadian bass guitarists
20th-century Canadian guitarists
21st-century Canadian guitarists
20th-century Canadian male singers
21st-century Canadian male singers
Canadian songwriters
Canadian record producers
Alternative metal bass guitarists
Garage rock musicians
Musicians from Toronto
Writers from Toronto
People from North York
Pop punk musicians
Canadian punk rock bass guitarists
Male bass guitarists